Bacău Region (Regiunea Bacău) was one of the newly established (in 1950) administrative divisions of the People's Republic of Romania, copied after the Soviet style of territorial organisation.

History
The capital of the region was Bacău, and its territory comprised an area similar to the nowadays Bacău and Neamț counties. In 1956 the region included the Zeletin and Adjud raions from the dissolved Bârlad Region and the Roman Raion from Iași Region. In 1960 the  Zeletin Raion was dissolved, most of the component communes passing to Adjud Raion, and in 1964 Buhuși Raion was dissolved, and all its communes were included into Bacău and Piatra Neamț raions.

Neighbors
Bacău Region had as neighbors:

1950–1952: East: Iași Region and Bârlad Region; South: Putna Region and Stalin Region; West: Mureș Region; North: Suceava Region.
1952–1956: East: Iași Region; South: Bârlad Region; West: Magyar Autonomous Region; North: Suceava Region.
1956–1968:  East: Iași Region; South: Galați Region; West: Brașov Region and Magyar Autonomous Region; North: Suceava Region.

Rayons

1950–1952: Bacău, Moinești, Târgu Ocna, Buhuși, Piatra Neamț, Târgu Neamț.
1952–1956: Bacău, Moinești, Târgu Ocna, Buhuși, Piatra Neamț, Târgu Neamț, Ceahlău.
1956–1960: Bacău, Moinești, Târgu Ocna, Buhuși, Piatra Neamț, Târgu Neamț, Zeletin (centered on Podu Turcului), Adjud, Roman.
1960–1964: Bacău, Moinești, Târgu Ocna, Buhuși, Piatra Neamț, Târgu Neamț, Adjud, Roman.
1964–1968: Bacău, Moinești, Târgu Ocna, Piatra Neamț, Târgu Neamț, Adjud, Roman.

Regions of the People's Republic of Romania